Syed Masudal Hossain was an Indian politician and the member of the 11th Lok Sabha who represented Murshidabad parliamentary constituency of West Bengal State. He was born on 14 August 1939 in Beniagram area of Murshidabad district of West Bengal, and was associated with Communist Party of India.
Syed was also re-elected as the member of parliament during the 7th, 8th, 9th, 10th and 11th general elections (Lok Sabha) of the India.

References

1939 births
India MPs 1980–1984
India MPs 1984–1989
India MPs 1989–1991
India MPs 1991–1996
India MPs 1996–1997
People from Murshidabad district
Lok Sabha members from West Bengal
Living people